Hemaram Choudhary (born 18 January 1948) is current Cabinet Minister(Forest Minister) in Government of Rajasthan. He is a MLA of six term Gudamalani constituency from Rajasthan Legislative Assembly.

References

1948 births
Indian National Congress politicians
Living people
Rajasthan MLAs 1972–1977
Rajasthan MLAs 1977–1980
Rajasthan MLAs 1980–1985
Rajasthan MLAs 1998–2003
Rajasthan MLAs 2003–2008
Rajasthan MLAs 2008–2013
State cabinet ministers of Rajasthan
Rajasthan MLAs 2018–2023
Indian National Congress politicians from Rajasthan